The slender roughy (Optivus elongatus) is a fish of the family Trachichthyidae. Until 2004 when two new species were described, the slender roughy was believed to be the only species in the genus Optivus. Its length is up to  standard length or  overall total length.

References

Optivus
Fish described in 1859
Taxa named by Albert Günther